Sanford USD Medical Center is a hospital operated by the Sanford Health system in Sioux Falls, South Dakota. It is classified as a Level II Trauma center. It was ranked as one of the 100 Great Hospitals in America by Becker's Hospital Review in 2017 and 2018.

Sanford University of South Dakota Medical Center is the largest tertiary hospital in South Dakota and it serves as the primary teaching institution for the Sanford School of Medicine, at the University of South Dakota. Sanford USD Medical Center is the largest employer in Sioux Falls, South Dakota, with approximately 7,300 staff. 

Sanford USD Medical Center is a part of an integrated health care system.

References

External links 

 Sanford Health

Hospitals in South Dakota
Buildings and structures in Sioux Falls, South Dakota
Trauma centers